Live in Maui is an album by the Jimi Hendrix Experience documenting their performance outdoors on Maui, Hawaii, on July 30, 1970. It marks the first official release of Hendrix's two full sets recorded during the filming of Rainbow Bridge (1971). The two-CD and three-LP set was released on November 20, 2020, along with a video documentary titled Music, Money, Madness... Jimi Hendrix in Maui.

Their performance on Maui was the trio's second-to-last in the U.S. during their final The Cry of Love Tour. During the first set, they played mainly songs from the Experience studio albums and Band of Gypsys. The second set mostly contains new songs Hendrix was in the process of recording for a planned fourth studio album.

Background
Although both the 1971 Rainbow Bridge film and album identify the artist as "Jimi Hendrix", Live in Maui lists "the Jimi Hendrix Experience" with Mitch Mitchell on drums and Billy Cox on bass. Despite claiming to be a soundtrack, the Rainbow Bridge  album did not include any of Hendrix's Maui performances. Several heavily edited songs totaling 17 minutes were first released with the Rainbow Bridge film.  Additional songs were released on The Jimi Hendrix Experience box set (2000) (a medley of "Hey Baby" / "In from the Storm") and Voodoo Child: The Jimi Hendrix Collection (2001) ("Foxey Lady").

The trio performed two fifty-minute sets; however, there were technical problems partly due to the high winds in the unprotected former pasture. For the portions used in the film Rainbow Bridge, Mitchell re-recorded his drum parts at Electric Lady Studio in New York City in 1971, but Hendrix had no further input.

Critical reception
In a review for AllMusic, Mark Deming gave Live in Maui a rating of four out of five stars. He noted the less-than-ideal recording conditions and added:

Hugh Fielder, writing for Classic Rock, also commented on the recording problems, which led to the Maui recordings being passed over for years in favor of Hendrix's performances at the Atlanta International Pop Festival (1970) (latest release Freedom: Atlanta Pop Festival, 2015) and Isle of Wight Festival 1970 (Blue Wild Angel, 2002). However, he noted that "[n]ow the latest digital audio technology has enabled them to be brought up to scratch (almost)" and gave the album three and a half out of five stars. But, he felt that "[t]he second set is looser and in danger of falling apart at times, before Hendrix wakes up and rips through "Stone Free".

Track listing
Because of recording difficulties, the album sequencing differs somewhat from the actual performance. The first set opened with "Spanish Castle Magic" and "Lover Man" before "Hey Baby (New Rising Sun)" and "Message to Love" followed "In from the Storm". Mitchell re-recorded the drums parts in 1971 on "Hey Baby" (both sets), "In from the Storm", "Foxy Lady", "Hear My Train A Comin'" (first set), "Voodoo Child (Slight Return)", "Purple Haze", and "Star Spangled Banner"; the original drums parts are included on the balance.

All songs were written by Jimi Hendrix, except "Sunshine of Your Love", "Star Spangled Banner", and "Hey Joe".

Personnel
Jimi Hendrixguitars, music and lyrics
Mitch Mitchelldrums (original live and overdubs)
Billy Coxbass guitar

Production
Eddie Kramer – producer, stereo and 5.1 mix engineer, drum overdubs recording engineer
Janie Hendrix – producer
John McDermott – producer, Blu-ray director, technical liner notes
Mike Neal – remote recording, concert sound mixer
Harry McCune Sound Service – concert sound equipment
John Jansen – drum overdubs recording engineer
Spencer Guerra – assistant engineer
Chandler Harrod – 5.1 mix engineer
Bernie Grundman – mastering
Jeff Slate – liner notes
Brian Byrnes – cover and booklet photography
Daniel Teheney – jacket photography
Phil Yarnall – art design
Barry Gruber – photo research
Steve Pesant – photo research

Charts

Footnotes

References

Jimi Hendrix live albums
2020 live albums
Live albums published posthumously
Legacy Recordings live albums